Klyce is a surname. Notable people with the surname include:

 Henry A. Klyce (born  1948), American entrepreneur, inventor, businessman, musician, and philanthropist
 Ren Klyce, American sound designer
 Scudder Klyce (1879–1933), American philosopher